A catechol estrogen is a steroidal estrogen that contains catechol (1,2-dihydroxybenzene) within its structure. The catechol estrogens are endogenous metabolites of estradiol and estrone and include the following compounds:

 2-Hydroxylated:
 2-Hydroxyestradiol
 2-Hydroxyestrone
 2-Hydroxyestriol
 4-Hydroxylated:
 4-Hydroxyestradiol
 4-Hydroxyestrone
 4-Hydroxyestriol

The most abundant catechol estrogen in serum and urine is 2-hydroxyestrone, with 2-hydroxyestradiol and 2-hydroxyestriol also being formed, while the principal 4-hydroxy catechol estrogen, 4-hydroxyestrone, is present in only small amounts in urine. 4-Hydroxyestriol has been detected in the urine of pregnant women. The catechol estrogens are formed from estradiol and estrone by cytochrome P450 enzymes predominantly in the liver but also in extrahepatic tissues, and are metabolized by catechol O-methyltransferase (COMT) into methoxylated estrogens such as 2-methoxyestradiol and 4-methoxyestrone as well as by conjugation via other phase II enzymes. Under poor conditions of inactivation by phase II enzymes, catechol estrogens can undergo oxidation to reactive quinones and semiquinones, and this has been hypothesized to contribute to estrogen-induced carcinogenesis.

Similarly to estradiol and estrone, catechol estrogens possess estrogenic activity. 2-Hydroxylated catechol estrogens are weak and possibly antiestrogenic estrogens, whereas their 4-hydroxylated counterparts are more potent in their estrogenic activity. For instance, 2-hydroxyestrone reportedly shows negligible uterotrophic effect in animals, whereas 4-hydroxy catechol estrogens show moderate changes in stimulating uterine weight. In addition to being substrates for COMT similarly to catecholamines like dopamine, norepinephrine, and epinephrine, catechol estrogens are potent competitive inhibitors of COMT as well as of tyrosine hydroxylase, and may affect both catecholamine biosynthesis and metabolism.

See also
 16α-Hydroxyestrone
 Estriol (16α-hydroxyestradiol)
 Epiestriol (16β-hydroxyestradiol)
 Estrogen conjugate
 Lipoidal estradiol

References

Catechol-O-methyltransferase inhibitors
Estranes
Estrogens
Human metabolites
Steroid hormones